The 1996 Nottingham Open was a men's tennis tournament played on grass courts at the Nottingham Tennis Centre in Nottingham in the United Kingdom and was part of the World Series of the 1996 ATP Tour. It was the seventh edition of the tournament and was held from 17 June through 23 June 1996. Fifth-seeded Jan Siemerink won the singles title.

Finals

Singles

 Jan Siemerink defeated  Sandon Stolle 6–3, 7–6(7–0)
 It was Siemerink's 3rd title of the year and the 10th of his career.

Doubles

 Mark Petchey /  Danny Sapsford defeated  Neil Broad /  Piet Norval 6–7, 7–6, 6–4
 It was Petchey's only title of the year and the 1st of his career. It was Sapsford's only title of the year and the 1st of his career.

Nottingham Open
Nottingham Open
Nottingham Open